William Logan was an Australian cricketer. He played two first-class cricket matches for Victoria between 1882 and 1888.

See also
 List of Victoria first-class cricketers

References

External links
 

Year of birth missing
Year of death missing
Australian cricketers
Victoria cricketers
Place of birth missing